Friends Forever may refer to:

Books 
Friends Forever (novel), a 2012 novel by Danielle Steel 
Friends Forever, a book adapted from the comics series W.I.T.C.H.

Film and television 
Friends Forever (1987 film) or Venner for altid, a Danish film 
Friends Forever (2007 film), an Indian animated feature film of 2007
Friends Forever (TV series), a 2010 Malaysian Chinese drama
"Friends Forever" (LazyTown), a television episode

Music 
Friends Forever (Sharon, Lois & Bram album), 1998
"Friends Forever" (song), a song by Thunderbugs, 1999
"Graduation (Friends Forever)", a song by Vitamin C, 2000
Friends Forever, an album by the cast of the TV series The Saddle Club, 2003
Friends Forever, an album from the TV series Tweenies
"Friends Forever", a song from the TV series Saved by the Bell
"Friends Forever", a song from the TV series Bear in the Big Blue House
Friends Forever, a band signed to Load Records

See also
Forever Friends (disambiguation)